Cima Fontanaccia is a 1153 metres high mountain in the Ligurian Apennines, in Italy.

Geography 

The mountain is located in the province of Genova, in Liguria, and belongs to the municipality of Cogoleto. It stands on a brief ridge which, starting from the main chain of the Apennines near Rocca del Lago, heads south-east towards the Ligurian Sea and after Cima Fontanaccia continues with Monte Rama and Bric Camulà.

Access to the summit 
The summit of Cima Fontanaccia can be accessed following a short unmarked trak departing from the foothpath connecting Monte Rama and Rifugio Prato Rotondo.

Nature conservation 
The mountain is included in the Parco naturale regionale del Beigua.

Mountain huts 
 Rifugio Prato Rotondo (1108 m).
 Rifugio Padre Rino (903 m)

References

Mountains of Liguria
Fontanaccia
Mountains of the Apennines